A telegraph hill is a hill or other natural elevation, chosen as part of an optical telegraph system because of the relatively great distance between it and at least one other point, which it may observe or be observed from. In the 18th and  19th centuries, such points were in some cases in permanent use for commerce and public administration, and in others, identified in advance of need or as need arose, especially for command and control in military operations.

History of telecommunications
Telegraphy